Joaquina Rosillo (born 11 August 1993) is a team handball player from Uruguay. She has played on the Uruguay women's national handball team, and participated at the 2011 World Women's Handball Championship in Brazil.

In 2010, she competed in the Youth World Handball Championship in Dominican Republic.

References

1993 births
Living people
Uruguayan female handball players
21st-century Uruguayan women